The 2019 U.S. Poker Open was the second season of the U.S. Poker Open, a series of high-stakes poker tournaments. It took place from February 13-23 at the Aria Resort and Casino in Las Vegas, Nevada. There were ten scheduled events with buy-ins ranging from $10,000 to $100,000. A short deck tournament was added to the schedule, while the buy-in for the Main Event was increased from $50,000 to $100,000.

Like the first season, the series was sponsored by Poker Central and all events were streamed live on PokerGO.

David Peters won both the Main Event for $1,320,000 and the $100,000 series championship with a total of one win and three final tables.

Schedule

Series leaderboard

Results

Event #1: $10,000 No Limit Hold'em

 2-Day Event: February 13-14
 Number of Entries: 90
 Total Prize Pool: $900,000
 Number of Payouts: 13
 Winning Hand:

Event #2: $10,000 Pot Limit Omaha

 2-Day Event: February 14-15
 Number of Entries: 64
 Total Prize Pool: $640,000
 Number of Payouts: 10
 Winning Hand:

Event #3: $10,000 No Limit Hold'em

 2-Day Event: February 15-16
 Number of Entries: 91
 Total Prize Pool: $910,000
 Number of Payouts: 13
 Winning Hand:

Event #4: $10,000 Short Deck

 2-Day Event: February 16-17
 Number of Entries: 42
 Total Prize Pool: $419,900
 Number of Payouts: 6
 Winning Hand:

Event #5: $25,000 No Limit Hold'em

 2-Day Event: February 17-18
 Number of Entries: 59
 Total Prize Pool: $1,475,000
 Number of Payouts: 9
 Winning Hand:

Event #6: $25,000 Pot Limit Omaha

 2-Day Event: February 18-19
 Number of Entries: 39
 Total Prize Pool: $975,000
 Number of Payouts: 6
 Winning Hand:

Event #7: $25,000 No Limit Hold'em

 2-Day Event: February 19-20
 Number of Entries: 60
 Total Prize Pool: $1,500,000
 Number of Payouts: 9
 Winning Hand:

Event #8: $25,000 Mixed Game

 2-Day Event: February 20-21
 Number of Entries: 20
 Total Prize Pool: $500,000
 Number of Payouts: 3
 Winning Hand:  (Limit Hold'em)

Event #9: $50,000 No Limit Hold'em

 2-Day Event: February 21-22
 Number of Entries: 41
 Total Prize Pool: $2,050,000
 Number of Payouts: 6
 Winning Hand:

Event #10: $100,000 No Limit Hold'em Main Event

 2-Day Event: February 22-23
 Number of Entries: 33
 Total Prize Pool: $3,300,000
 Number of Payouts: 5
 Winning Hand:

References

External links
Results
Poker Central coverage

2019 in poker
2019 in sports in Nevada
Television shows about poker
Poker tournaments